The 2022 Sunshine Ladies Tour was the 9th season of the Sunshine Ladies Tour, a series of professional golf tournaments for women based in South Africa.

Schedule
The season consisted of 7 events, all held in South Africa, played between January and April. 

The Investec South African Women's Open was again co-sanctioned with the Ladies European Tour, as was the Joburg Ladies Open for the first time.

Order of Merit
This shows the leaders in the final Order of Merit.

Source:

References

External links
Official homepage of the Sunshine Ladies Tour

Sunshine Ladies Tour
Sunshine Ladies Tour